This is a timeline of Amazon Web Services, which offers a suite of cloud computing services that make up an on-demand computing platform.

AWS Prelude

Full timeline

Partnerships

Amazon Web Services outages

See also 
 List of Amazon products and services
 History of Amazon

References 

Amazon Web Services